Aclystothrips is a genus of thrips in the family Phlaeothripidae.

Species
 Aclystothrips aberrans
 Aclystothrips priesneri

References

Phlaeothripidae
Thrips
Thrips genera